Berthold Hochschild (March 6, 1860 – January 24, 1928) was a mining magnate, a founder of the American Metal Company, and a philanthropist.

Biography
Hochschild was born to a Jewish family  in Biblis, Germany, the son of Auguste Gustina (née Bendheim) and Koppel Jakob Hochschild. In 1881, his brother Zachary Hochschild, along with his cousin Wilhelm Ralph Merton and Leo Ellinger, founded Metallgesellschaft AG. In 1886, he immigrated to the United States, founding American Metal with Jacob Longeloth two years later. He had two sons, Harold K. Hochschild and Walter Hochschild, and a daughter, Gertrude Hochschild (married to Russian World War I ace and Sikorsky Aircraft test pilot Boris Sergievsky).  Harold founded the Adirondack Museum in Blue Mountain Lake, New York and Walter Hochschild built an Adirondack Great Camp on Eagle Lake in 1938.

The sons of his cousin were Bolivian tin baron Mauricio Hochschild and Chilean mining magnate Sali Hochschild.

References

New York Times, January 25, 1928, Berthold Hochschild. Former Chairman of the American Metal. Co. Dies at Age of 68.

19th-century German Jews
German emigrants to the United States
1860 births
1928 deaths
German businesspeople in metals
Berthold
German commodities traders